The following page lists power stations in Bolivia. Most of them are managed by ENDE.

Installed generating capacity and production 
Bolivia had an estimated installed generating capacity of 1,365 MW in 2012 and produced an estimated 7.375 billion kWh in 2013.

Hydroelectric 
Hydroelectric power plants with a nameplate capacity > 20 MW.

Thermal 
Thermal power plants with a nameplate capacity > 80 MW.

Additional information 
Bulo Bulo, Cochabamba
2 X 45 MW LM6000 gas turbines
Natural gas

Bulo Bulo was built by a joint venture of NRG Energy, Vattenfall, and Pan American Energy LLC. It went commercial on 30 Jun 2000 with a 30yr generation license. In May 2003, Petrolera Chaco purchased the plant.

Entre Rios, Cochabamba
4 X 30 MW SGT-700 gas turbines
natural gas

This project is a 60:40 JV of Ende and PDVSA and was the result of an Aug 2007 between Presidents Evo Morales and Hugo Chávez. It cost about $80mn and connects to the 230kV grid. Commercial operation was on 22 Jul 2010.
 
Guaracachi, Santa Cruz
210-MW, 2+1 CCGT plant with 6001FA gas turbines
Natural gas

In Oct 2010, two 6FA gas turbines at Guaracachi  in Santa Cruz were converted to combined-cycle operation. In addition to the HRSGs and steam set, the installation included a new 5-cell mechanical draft tower and a demineralized water treatment plant. The plant was 50%-owned by Rurelec PLC when nationalized by Bolivian President Evo Morales in Feb 2010.

See also

 List of power stations
 List of power stations in South America

External links 
 NRG Energy acquires South American generation capacity from Vattenfall
 Industry Picture Cards for Bolivia

References

 
Power stations
Bolivia